The Singapore Garden Festival is a biennial garden and flower show held in Singapore. It is the first and only international garden show in the tropics to showcase creations from the world’s top award-winning garden and floral designers under one roof. The festival is organised by the National Parks Board of Singapore, in partnership with the Agri-Food and Veterinary Authority of Singapore (AVA), the Orchid Society of South East Asia (Singapore), the Singapore Gardening Society and the Singapore Tourism Board (STB).

The festival features international landscape and garden designers, florists and horticulturists convening in a single location. This contrasts with other international horticultural events which feature mainly domestic and regional designers and market vendors.

The past two festivals attracted more than half a million visitors combined. The inaugural festival, held at the Suntec Singapore's International Convention and Exhibition Centre from 16 to 25 December 2006, attracted more than 200,000 visitors, and the 2008 festival attracted more than 300,000 visitors.

The 2008 festival featured 18 show gardens and 14 floral displays by 35 local and foreign award-winning landscape and garden designers, florists and horticulturists from 17 countries. It also featured a three-day international trade exhibition and conference, where leading internationally renowned experts provided insight into emerging markets and trends that were driving the landscape and horticulture industry. At the closing ceremony of the 2008 Festival, Minister for National Development Mah Bow Tan announced that the Festival is a fundamental element of the strategy to boost Singapore's transformation into a city in a garden and to raise the bar for the landscaping and horticulture industry.

The Singapore Garden Festival 2010 

The Singapore Garden Festival 2010 returned to Suntec Singapore International Convention and Exhibition Centre from 15 to 22 July 2010. Some exhibits new to the 2010 festival included:

 Balcony Gardens Showcase offered city dwellers inspiration on how they could transform their balcony into a soothing retreat.  Award-winning designers Ng Sek San and Jun-Ichi Inada put together a display of eight balconies.
 Periscope Garden was a visual treat for children. This unique garden allowed visitors to explore different thematic gardens through a looking glass.
 Supermarket Garden was an educational trip down the aisles of the Supermarket Garden which showed how produce and food are grown on farms.
 Home Gardeners’ Showcase offered the public a peek into the ways in which everyday gardeners spruce up their homes with greenery in innovative ways. From innovative greening ideas to vertical greenery, these home gardens showed visitors how to achieve green spaces in their own homes.

Returning events were:

 Best of Show Landscape and Fantasy Gardens featured creations by local designers and top award-winning garden designers from renowned garden shows around the world.
 Floral Windows to the World featured colorful and vibrant cut-flower displays and floral masterpieces with set design and lighting by floral designers from home and abroad.
 Singapore Orchid Show showcased Southeast Asia’s rich and diverse heritage of orchids.
 Garden Fiesta included fringe activities such as talks, demonstrations and exhibitions catering to the public, families, serious gardeners as well as hobbyists
 Vibrant Marketplace offered a wide array of plants, gardening and landscaping products and services, aw well as arts and crafts supplies.

Awards 
In 2014, the Singapore Garden Festival was awarded the 2014 International Garden Tourism - Achievement of The Year Award which was presented at the Gardens Without Limits Conference in Metz, France.

References

External links
Singapore Garden Festival
Flower Delivery in Singapore
National Parks Board, Singapore

Festivals in Singapore
Horticultural exhibitions
Garden festivals in Singapore